Abelmoschus ficulneus is a species of flowering plant in the genus Abelmoschus, family Malvaceae. Commonly known as white wild musk mallow or native rosella, it is fibrous perennial with a woody stem. Its flowers are about an inch in diameter, either pink or white, with a rose center; its leaves are palmate.

Leaves are rough on both sides, toothed, and have 3 to 5 lobes. The stocks are short and colored white to pink with a dark purple center. Flowers last a few days. The plant has small hairs which may cause irritation. Seeds that are still in their growth period are medium to dark green, and when they are mature they turn dark brown, and split into five parts to release 10 to 20 brown to black spherical seeds, covered in tiny hairs.

Abelmoschus ficulneus germinates in the spring and summer months, after the effects of rainfall and irrigation have set in. The plant grows rapidly over spring and summer several months after emergence, through autumn. Mature seeds are produced within a month of flowering in the late summer and autumn seasons.

The species is native to north and east Africa, Madagascar, Indomalaya and Northern Australia, where it has become a common crop weed, particularly in cotton.

Gallery

References

ficulneus
Flora of Africa
Flora of tropical Asia
Flora of the Northern Territory
Flora of Queensland
Rosids of Western Australia
Malvales of Australia
Plants described in 1753
Taxa named by Carl Linnaeus